Adetomiwa Adebawore (born March 4, 2001) is an American football defensive end for the Northwestern Wildcats.

Early life and high school
Adebawore grew up in Kansas City, Missouri and attended North Kansas City High School. He was rated a three-star recruit and committed to play college football at Northwestern over offers from Washington State, Navy, and Tulane.

College career
Adebawore played in eight games during his freshman season at Northwestern. He became a starter for the Wildcats during his sophomore season and finished the year with 17 tackles, six tackles for loss, and two sacks. Adebawore was named honorable mention All-Big Ten Conference as a junior after leading the team with 4.5 sacks and 8.5 tackles for loss. He was named third team All-Big Ten as a senior after recording 38 tackles, nine tackles for loss, five sacks, and two forced fumbles. Adebawore played in the 2023 Senior Bowl.

Personal life
Adebawore's younger brother, Adepoju, plays defensive end for the Oklahoma Sooners.

References

External links
 
 Northwestern Wildcats bio

Living people
American football defensive ends
Northwestern Wildcats football players
2001 births
Players of American football from Kansas City, Missouri